Martín Nicolás Peralta (born 8 April 1997) is an Argentine professional footballer who plays as a forward for Villa Mitre.

Career
Atlético Tucumán were Peralta's first club, joining in 2014. After playing in the youth system, Peralta made his professional debut on 28 May 2017 in a 2–1 league defeat to Talleres; one further appearance followed in June against San Martín (SJ). January 2019 saw Peralta depart on loan to Torneo Federal A's San Jorge. He scored three goals in his first nine appearances, before netting seven in the play-offs; including a hat-trick over Sportivo Desamparados on 12 May. They'd eventually lose out to Alvarado. In July, newly promoted Primera B Nacional team Estudiantes loaned Peralta. One goal in nine matches followed.

In October 2020, Peralta was loaned out for a third time as he joined second tier side San Martín. Soon after signing, Peralta put out a controversial tweet to say it was a "dream come true" to join San Martín; who are rivals of Atlético Tucumán. He later claimed he didn't intend any disrespect towards his parent club.

Career statistics
.

References

External links

1997 births
Living people
Sportspeople from San Miguel de Tucumán
Argentine footballers
Association football forwards
Argentine Primera División players
Torneo Federal A players
Primera Nacional players
Atlético Tucumán footballers
San Jorge de Tucumán footballers
Estudiantes de Río Cuarto footballers
San Martín de Tucumán footballers
Boca Unidos footballers
Villa Mitre footballers